Pontvallain is a commune in the Sarthe department in the region of Pays de la Loire in north-western France.

It was the site, on 4 December 1370, of the Battle of Pontvallain, a significant military engagement between England and France (who had the victory) during the Hundred Years' War.

See also
Communes of the Sarthe department

References

Communes of Sarthe